The women's high jump event  at the 1979 European Athletics Indoor Championships was held on 25 February in Vienna.

Results

References

High jump at the European Athletics Indoor Championships
High
Euro